Basketball was contested at the 2002 West Asian Games in Kuwait City, Kuwait from 4 April to 9 April. All events took place at Qadsia Hall.

Results

References
 Results

External links
 Official website

2002 West Asian Games
West Asian Games
2002 West Asian Games
2002